The Zastava M07 is a modern military sniper rifle developed and manufactured by Zastava Arms, Serbia. The M07 rifle is based on the Mauser 98 bolt action, and the barrel is made of chrome-vanadium steel. The rifle is loaded from a detachable magazine with a capacity of 5 rounds.

External links
Official website of Zastava Arms
Zastava M07

7.62×51mm NATO rifles
M07
Bolt-action rifles
Zastava Arms
Military equipment introduced in the 2000s